Scooby-Doo! and the Spooky Swamp is a third person platform video game developed by Torus Games and published by Warner Bros. Interactive Entertainment for the PlayStation 2, Wii and Nintendo DS consoles and also for Microsoft Windows. The game was first released on September 14, 2010, in North America and was released in the following weeks in PAL regions. It is the fifth Scooby-Doo! video game title to come to sixth generation consoles. The game is a follow up to Scooby-Doo! First Frights.

Plot summary 
Shaggy and Scooby-Doo, as hungry as always, venture into the swamp following a scent. There they meet swamp resident Lila, an intelligent girl who loves cooking, and asks them to recover ingredients to finish her stew. Shaggy and Scooby set off with the gang to solve two mysteries while secretly collecting the ingredients.

Gameplay 
Just like First Frights, the player controls the five members of the Mystery Inc, and the gameplay and interface are highly reminiscent of TT Games' Lego game series. The games has light puzzle elements, platforming, and combat. The primary goal of the game is to solve mysteries and find ingredients to Lila's stew. Each character of the gang has different skills and functions. The game contains many collectibles, including: ingredients for a hoagie, the letters of 'Scooby', Scooby-Doo's collar medallion, ghost photographs, and costumes. Collectibles, options, cheat codes, rewards and more can be accessed in the Swamp's Clubhouse. By defeating enemies, small masks are collected; upon reaching a specified number of masks, the information about the equivalent enemy are shown in the Clubhouse. The player can get trophies for doing certain tasks. The player can also play with a friend in multiplayer co-operation.

In addition to Lila's swamp, players assist characters in two other locations, El Muncho, a Southwestern ghost town, and Howling Peaks, a snowy alpine village. In El Muncho, the citizens are frightened by the "El Scaryachi," and the Scooby gang must help Costington (a character from First Frights), twins Emilio and Esteban, and a secret spy Romero. In Howling Peaks, the locals are frightened by a Yeti, and the gang must help Daphne's cousin Anna (who also appeared in First Frights), a snowboarder Moose, Dustin Planks, Barry "Baz" Buckley, and Sergio. Throughout the game, the player will occasionally encounter a talking frog named Philippe Extraordinare.

Reception
Scooby-Doo! and the Spooky Swamp was met with mixed reception according to review aggregators Metacritic and GameRankings, with average ratings of 68.88% and 76/100 for the Wii version.

References

External links 
 

2010 video games
Cartoon Network video games
Detective video games
Multiplayer and single-player video games
Nintendo DS games
PlayStation 2 games
Torus Games games
Video games based on Scooby-Doo
Video games developed in Australia
Warner Bros. video games
Wii games
Windows games